Theobald V of Blois (1130 – 20 January 1191), also known as Theobald the Good, was Count of Blois from 1151 to 1191.

Biography
Theobald was son of Theobald II of Champagne and Matilda of Carinthia. Although he was the second son, Theobald inherited Blois (including Chartres), while his elder brother, Henry got the more important county of Champagne.

Theobald first married Sybil of Chateaurenault, which made him jure uxoris Lord of Chateaurenault. Next, in 1164, he married Alix of France, daughter of Louis VII of France and his first wife Eleanor of Aquitaine.

According to medieval Jewish sources, in 1171 Theobald was responsible for orchestrating the first blood libel in continental Europe. His alleged Jewish mistress Pulcelina of Blois unsuccessfully attempted to prevent him. As a result of a church-sponsored trial, 30 or 31 members of the Jewish community were burned at the stake.

Theobald lived primarily in Chartres and had its city walls renovated. After joining his brother Henry and a number of other nobles in opposing the young king Philip II, he reconciled with the king and supported him on the Third Crusade. He arrived in the summer of 1190 in the Holy Land and died on 20 January 1191, during the Siege of Acre.

Family
Theobald and Alix had seven children:
Theobald, d. young
Philip, d. young
Henry, d. young
Louis I of Blois (d. 1205)
Alix, Abbess of Fontevrault
Margaret, married Walter of Avesnes, later Countess of Blois
Isabella, married John II, lord of Oisy and Montreuil, later countess of Chartres

References

External links
Counts of Blois

Sources

Theobald V
Theobald V
Blois, Theobald V, comte de
1130 births
1191 deaths